Microichthys is a genus of very small deepwater cardinalfishes which were only known from the Strait of Messina in the Mediterranean Sea, although M. coccoi has recently been recorded in the Aegean Sea and around the Azores. The currently recognized species in this genus are:
 Microichthys coccoi Rüppell, 1852
 Microichthys sanzoi Spartà, 1950
 Microichthys atlanticus Fricke, Ordines, Williston, 2020

References

Epigonidae